Lolli is an Italian surname. Notable people with the surname include:

 Alberto Carlo Lolli (born c.1876), Italian film director of the silent era
 Antonio Lolli (1725–1802), Italian violinist and composer
 Anthony Lolli, developer and founder of the Brooklyn-based brokerage firm Rapid Realty
 Claudio Lolli (born 1950), Italian singer-songwriter
 Giambattista Lolli (1698–1769), Italian chess player
 Nicolò Lolli (born 1994), Italian professional footballer
 Tommaso Lolli (died 1667), Italian Roman Catholic prelate

See also
 "Lolli Lolli (Pop That Body)", a song by Three 6 Mafia
 Lollipop, a type of confectionery
 Lolly (disambiguation)
 Lally (disambiguation)
 Loli (disambiguation)

Italian-language surnames